Four police constables and a private security guard were killed and 20 other people injured when, on 22 January 2002, Islamic militants attacked an American cultural centre in Kolkata, India. The centre houses a library, the American embassy's public affairs office, a press section and a cultural wing.

Two motorcycle-borne attackers, draped in shawls, sped up to the American Centre building at about 6:15 IST, refusing to stop at checkpoints and began shooting at police guards from an AK-47 assault rifle who returned fire. Four of the dead were Kolkata police constables while the one of the dead belonged to a private security agency Group Four. The constables killed in the attack were identified as Pijush Sarker, Ujjal Burman, Suresh Hembram and Anup Mondal and belonged to the 5th battalion of Kolkata Armed Police.

Two groups claimed responsibility for the attack. A Harkat-ul-Jihad al-Islami (HUJI) member, Farhan Malik owned responsibility and said the attack was in protest against "the evil empire of America", while another person claiming to be a member of Asif Raza Commandos, a gang with ties to radical Islamic groups, claimed responsibility. Malik was also wanted in connection with a case of kidnapping a Kolkata shoe baron Partha Pratim Roy Barman, who was later released on a ransom of  37.5 million.

Four days after the attack, two men — Salim and Zahid — were killed in an encounter with a Delhi police team in Hazaribagh in Jharkhand. The police had come to know about the involvement of Aftab Ansari in the American Centre attack from the dying declarations of Salim and Zahid.

On 23 January 2002, Aftab Ansari alias Farhan Malik, prime suspect in the attack was arrested in Dubai. On 9 February 2002, he was deported to India. Ansari was in possession of Pakistani travel documents with his passport number J872142, being issued in Lahore in February, 2000, in the name of Shafiq Mohammad Rana.

On 28 April 2005, a Special CBI Court found Aftab Ansari and six others guilty for the attack. Aftab Ansari and Jamiluddin Nasir were sentenced to death under Section 121 of the Indian Penal Code for waging war against the state. The others sentenced along with Ansari are: Rehan Alam, Musharat Hussain, Adil Hasan, Hasrat Alam and Shakir Akhtar.

On 5 February 2010, the Calcutta High Court upheld the death sentence of Aftab Ansari and Jamiluddin Nasir but commuted the capital punishment awarded to three others to seven years imprisonment.

See also
 Sajal Barui
 Bowbazaar Bomb Blast 1993
 List of terrorist incidents, 2002

References

External links
The arrest of Aftab Ansari
Aftab Ansari exposes spread of Dawood tentacles

21st-century mass murder in India
Attacks in India in 2002
Mass murder in 2002
American cultural centre in Kolkata, 2002 terrorist attack
American cultural centre in Kolkata, 2002 terrorist attack
Crime in Kolkata
2000s in West Bengal
Attacks on diplomatic missions in India
Attacks in India
Islamic terrorism in India